This is a list of diplomatic missions in Samoa. There are currently 6 diplomatic missions in Apia (not including honorary consulates).

Embassies/High Commissions in Apia

Non-Resident Embassies/High Commissions
Resident in Wellington, otherwise noted.

 (Canberra)
 
 

 (Suva)
 (Canberra)
 (Canberra)
 (Canberra)
 

 
 (Canberra)
 (Tokyo)
 (Tokyo)

Non-resident Missions

See also
 Foreign relations of Samoa

References

External links
 Resident missions

Foreign relations of Samoa
Samoa
Diplomatic missions